Maria van der Holst-Blijlevens (born 6 May 1946) is a Dutch sprint canoer who competed in the early 1970s. Together with Mieke Jaapies she finished seventh in the K-2 500 m event at the 1972 Summer Olympics in Munich.

References

1946 births
Living people
Canoeists at the 1972 Summer Olympics
Dutch female canoeists
Olympic canoeists of the Netherlands
Sportspeople from Helmond
20th-century Dutch women